The .sch file extension is used to indicate a circuit schematic file by various electronic design automation programs, all using different file formats. These types of files are used by:

 OrCAD (old versions)
 EAGLE (all versions)
 Protel (old versions)
 Altium (some versions)
 KiCad (all versions)
 PADS (all versions)

See also
 Microsoft Schedule (also using this file extension)

References

SCH